The State Railway of Thailand (SRT) (abbrev. รฟท.) is the state-owned rail operator under the jurisdiction of the Ministry of Transport in Thailand.

History

The SRT was founded as the Royal State Railways of Siam (RSR) in 1890. King Chulalongkorn ordered the Department of Railways to be set up under the Department of Public Works and Town and Country Planning.  Construction of the Bangkok-Ayutthaya railway, the first part of the Northern Line, was started in 1890 and inaugurated on 26 March 1897.
The Thonburi-Phetchaburi line, later the Southern Line, was opened on 19 June 1903. The first railway commander of the RSR was Prince Purachatra Jayakara (Krom Phra Kamphaeng Phet Akkarayothin).

On 1 July 1951, RSR changed its name to the present State Railway of Thailand, which has status as a state enterprise agency.

On 7 April 2020, the Thai cabinet named Nirut Maneephan as the new chief of the SRT, the 29th governor in its history.  SRT had  of track, all of it meter gauge except the Airport Link. Nearly 91% was single-track railway (3,685 km) while 6%, mainly important sections around Bangkok, were double-track railway and 3% were triple-track railway. The network serves 47 provinces and around 35 million passengers annually. The passenger count is expected to double by 2032, when the network grows 6,463 km to serve 61 provinces.

SRT issues

Financial performance
The SRT has suffered a loss every year since it was turned into a state-owned enterprise under the Transport Ministry in 1951. The worst financially performing state enterprise, it reported a preliminary loss of 7.58 billion baht in 2010. In the fiscal year ending 30 September 2016, the military government budgeted 7,600 million baht for SRT infrastructure investments to be used for track duplication, an extension of Bangkok's elevated railway, and construction of bridges, fences, and track improvements, however, the SRT had managed to disburse only 53 percent of its allotted investment budget of 60 billion baht, compares with an average disbursement rate of 80 percent by Thailand's other 55 state-owned enterprises (SOEs). Disbursement rate is seen as an indicator of efficient management. SRT's budget from government for FY2020 was 13,574.9 million baht, increased from 9,087 million baht in FY2019.

"If you look at the SRT they are a bit like a patient in [intensive care] and everyone is saying to him 'you are the future' and trying to kick him out of bed when he is still moaning and groaning," said Ruth Banomyong, a logistics and transport expert at Thammasat University.

The SRT annual operating losses are estimated at a minimum of 10 billion baht. In 2018 and 2019, the SRT lost 12 and 17 billion baht respectively.  the SRT has debts amounting to nearly 190 billion baht. The SRT consistently operates at a loss despite being endowed with large amounts of property—the SRT is one of Thailand's largest land holders, owning an estimated 39,840 hectares— and receiving large government subsidies. SRT's latest property development scheme is the Chao Phraya Gateway project. It capitalises on SRT's 277 rai, 1.16 kilometre stretch of land on the river in the Khlong Toei District. The SRT hopes the project will help clear its 100 billion baht debt. The project is projected to break even within eight years and deliver profits of 140 billion baht. , SRT's plans are being submitted to the Transport Ministry for approval.

SRT's failings are reflected in passenger numbers, which, according to the Economist Intelligence Unit have dropped from 88 million in 1994 to 44 million in 2014, and 26 million in 2020. The SRT has long been popularly perceived by the public as inefficient and resistant to change. Trains are usually late, and most of its equipment is old and poorly maintained. Although SRT's operational costs amount to two baht per kilometre traveled, SRT fares defray only a fraction of that cost. SRT has not been permitted to hike fares since 1985 which below market rate.

Under the auspices of the Transport Ministry, the SRT has submitted a rehabilitation plan that will be presented to the State Enterprise Policy Commission on 30 July 2018. The commission, chaired by Prime Minister Prayut Chan-o-cha is expected to approve the plan. The plan calls for SRT to become the largest railway state enterprise in ASEAN. By 2027, anticipating income growth from asset management and cost management, SRT foresees profits of over 20 billion baht.

Hopewell litigation
Hopewell Holdings of Hong Kong was the lead contractor for SRT's ill-fated Bangkok Elevated Road and Train System. The project commenced in 1990 and was terminated by the Thai government in 1998, only 13% complete. Hopewell and the SRT each blamed the other for the failure of the 80 billion baht project. Both parties sued, and the case has been in litigation since its cancellation. On 23 April 2019, Thailand's Supreme Administrative Court upheld an arbitration committee's ruling in favour of Hopewell. The court ordered SRT to pay Hopewell compensation of 11.88 billion baht, plus 7.5% interest per year. The interest, totaling 13 billion baht, brings SRT's total liability to nearly 25 billion baht, payable within 180 days.

Lack of freight revenue
Rail freight, which is cheaper—only roughly half the cost of road transport—safer, and more environmentally-friendly than road transport, accounted for only 1.4 percent of freight tonnage carried in 2015. SRT aims to boost its share of cargo transport to six percent with its rail duplication by 2022. Expansion of SRT's freight service, which could earn more money than the heavily subsidized passenger service, has been neglected for decades in favour of Thailand's roads.

Workforce
The SRT's poor financial performance and resistance to reform, coupled with the Asian financial crisis of 1997, resulted in stringent restraints being placed on SRT staffing. In July 1998, the Thai cabinet issued an order that the SRT could only hire five new employees for every 100 retirees. , the order remains in effect. SRT officials estimated in 2017 that the enterprise needed to boost staff by 20 percent to 12,000.  In 2018 SRT claims that it needs 18,015 employees to operate efficiently, but only has 10,035 on staff. The train maintenance workforce has dwindled to 500 from 3,000 over the past 30 years. 

To make up the shortfall, the SRT hires around 4,000 "yearly staffs", usually on daily wages of 300 baht. It has also caused the SRT to pay massive amounts of overtime pay to current employees. For example, one station master in Pattani was paid 61,210 baht in monthly salary, but also an additional 102,271 baht in overtime pay. , the staffs employment quota was 4,056 but SRT hired 3,721 staffs.

, SRT employed 10,292 employees and 3,928 yearly staffs, totaling 14,220 while the SRT Board approved the addition of 1,330 new workers to bring the workforce to 15,550, still fewer than needed to address staff shortages. , SRT employed 9,204 employees and 3,721 yearly staffs totaling 12,925 while employment quotas respectively was 18,015 and 4,056 totaling 22,071.

Management issues
To address a long list of complaints accusing SRT of a lack of transparency in bids for projects and procurement deals, Prime Minister Prayut Chan-o-cha fired the governor and board of the State Railway of Thailand in February 2017, using his special powers under Section 44 of the interim constitution.

Ticketing
Tickets may be purchased online starting 1 February 2017 and may be purchased from 60 days in advance to two hours before departure.

Network

The SRT operates all of Thailand's national rail lines. Bangkok railway station (Hua Lamphong) is the main terminus of all routes. Phahonyothin and ICD Ladkrabang are the main freight terminals.

Railway Stations

Northern Line

The Northern Line runs alongside the Northeastern Line until the Ban Phachi Junction. There, it splits from the Northeastern Line and proceeds through Lopburi, Nakhon Sawan, Phichit, Phitsanulok, Denchai, Lampang, Lamphun, before finally reaching Chiang Mai, 751 km from Bangkok. There is also a branch off the mainline from Ban Dara Junction to Sawankhalok in Sukhothai Province.

 Krung Thep Aphiwat Central Terminal - Main station and freight terminal with main diesel locomotive depot and refueling facility.
 Ayutthaya Station - Ayutthaya main station. High passenger revenue, second only to Bangkok Station. It is possible to change here to the Northeastern Line.
 Ban Phachi Junction - A major junction, where the Northern and Northeastern lines separate.
 Lopburi Station - The end of northern Bangkok suburban service; a military town with much history.
 Nakhon Sawan Station - Nakhon Sawan Main Station, Nong Pling Station until 1956.
 Phichit Station - Phichit Main Station
 Phitsanulok Station - Phitsanulok Main station, town with the famous Phra Phuttha Chinnarat
 Ban Dara Junction - Junction for Sawankhalok Line
 Sawankhalok Station - Terminus of Sawankhalok Branch. Station for Sukhothai Province and travel to Sukhothai and Si Satchanalai Historical Parks.
 Uttaradit Station - Main station, Uttaradit Province.
 Sila At Station - Depot on the Northern Line. Refueling station and up trains will be cut at this station
 Den Chai Station - The dropping point for Phrae with a proposal for a junction for Den Chai – Chiang Rai route
 Nakhon Lampang Station - Depot on the Northern Line. Train will be cut further if going north to Chiang Mai.
 Khun Tan Station - Station in the mountains, base point and entrance for Doi Khuntan National Park. 
 Lamphun Station - Main station for Lamphun Province
 Chiang Mai Station - Northern terminus.

Northeastern Line

The Northeastern Line begins on the same route as the Northern Line, splitting at Ban Phachi Junction towards Nakhon Ratchasima. Then at Thanon Chira Junction, the line splits with one route passing Khon Kaen and Udon Thani before terminating at Nong Khai 624 kilometers from Bangkok. The other route passes through Buriram, Surin, Sisaket to reach Ubon Ratchathani, 575 km from Bangkok.

There is also another branch route originating from Kaeng Khoi Junction in Saraburi Province passing through Chai Badan District in Lopburi Province and Chatturat District in Chaiyaphum Province, before joining the mainline heading towards Nong Khai at Bua Yai Junction in Nakhon Ratchasima Province.

 Saraburi Station - Main Saraburi station, named Pak Priaw station until 1934.
 Kaeng Khoi Junction - The Bua Yai Line and Khlong Sip Kao line diverge from the mainline here. Main Depot with refuelling facility. The point for dividing freight trains into two trains to pass difficult section of Dong Phraya Yen (Kaeng Khoi - Pak Chong) or combining divided freight trains into one train
 Pak Chong Station - The gateway to Nakhon Ratchasima and the point for dividing freight trains into two to pass difficult section of Dong Phraya Yen (Kaeng Khoi - Pak Chong) or combining divided freight trains into one train
 Nakhon Ratchasima Station - Main depot of the Northeastern Line with refuelling facility and a branch line to 2nd Army Support Command. Main Nakhon Ratchasima station.
 Thanon Chira Junction - Junction for Nong Khai line close to Fort Suranaree (2nd Army Region HQ)
 Buriram Station - Buriram provincial station with a branch line to a quarry at Khao Kradong
 Surin Station - Main Surin station
 Sisaket Station - Main Sisaket station.
 Ubon Ratchathani Station in town of Warin Chamrap - Terminus of South Isaan Line (also known as Ubon Line) with depot and refuelling facility.  Named Varindr station until 1942-1943. Main Ubon Ratchathani Station.
 Lam Narai Station- Station on the Lam Narai/Bua Yai Branch, for Chai Badan Municipality.
 Chatturat Station- Station on the Lam Narai/Bua Yai Branch, alight for Chaiyaphum.
 Bua Yai Junction - junction with refuelling facility
 Khon Kaen Station - Khon Kaen main station
 Udon Thani Station - Udon Thani main station with refuelling facility.
 Nong Khai Station in town of Nong Khai - Terminus of North Isaan Line (also known as Nong Khai Line), provides a connection to Thanaleng Station in Vientiane Prefecture, Laos. Main Nong Khai station.

Southern Line

The Southern Line begins in Bangkok and heads west towards Nakhon Pathom before splitting into three different routes. One route heads west to Kanchanaburi Province (210 km) while another heads north towards Suphan Buri (157 km). The Southern Line itself continues southbound through Ratchaburi, Phetchaburi, Hua Hin, Prachuap Khiri Khan Province, Chumphon, to Surat Thani 678 kilometers distant. From Surat Thani, there is a westerly branch towards Khiri Rat Nikhom while the main line continues south to Thung Song Junction in Nakhon Si Thammarat Province where another branch reaches Kantang in Trang Province. Not far away, another branch separates off the mainline at Khao Chum Thong Junction. The main line from Nakhon Sri Thammarat continues through Phatthalung before reaching Hat Yai Junction in Songkhla Province. From here, a line branches to connect with the Malaysian railway at Padang Besar and the mainline continues to Su-ngai Kolok passing through Yala Province.

 Krung Thep Aphiwat Central Terminal - Main station and freight terminal with main diesel locomotive depot and refueling facility.
 Bang Bamru Station- Suburban Station, all trains must stop here. First station after crossing the Rama 6 Bridge from Bang Sue.
 Taling Chan Junction- Junction for Southern Main Line(Bang Sue-Taling Chan Link) and Thonburi Branch.
 Thon Buri Station - Former terminus of Southern Line, however some southern trains remain to start the journey here.
 Salaya Station- Suburban Station, for Phutthamonthon District and Mahidol University (Salaya Campus)
 Nakhon Pathom Station - Main southern suburban station. Main Nakhon Pathom station.
 Nong Pladuk Junction - Junction for Namtok Branch Line and Suphan Buri Branch Line.
 Ban Pong Station - Interchange to Kanchanaburi for those who did not travel along Nam Tok branch line
 Ratchaburi Station - Terminal for southern suburban service, also Ratchaburi main station.
 Phetchaburi Station - Phetchaburi main station.
 Hua Hin Station - Provincial Station for Hua Hin in Prachuap Khiri Khan with crew changing station.
 Wang Phong Station- One of the stations in Pran Buri. Also for the nearby Thanarat Military Camp. More trains stop here for Pran Buri than Pran Buri Station itself.
 Pran Buri Station- Smaller station for Pran Buri, with a well-established Saturday Night Market opposite the station. 
 Prachuap Khiri Khan Station - Prachuap Khiri Khan main station.
 Bang Saphan Yai Station - Regional town station. All trains going further south must stop here.
 Chumphon Station - Main Chumphon station, locomotive depot with refuelling facility
 Lang Suan Station- Provincial Station in Chumphon. Furthest extent of southern services from Thonburi.
 Ban Thung Pho Junction - Southern container yard, for Khiri Rat Nikhom Branch.
 Khiri Rat Nikhom Station - Terminus for the Khiri Rat Nikhom Branch and the railway to Phang Nga and Tanun (Phuket).
 Surat Thani Station - Crew changing station and Surat Thani main station.
 Thung Song Junction - Locomotive depot, refuelling facility and junction for Kantang Branch.
 Trang Station - Trang main station.
 Kantang Station - Terminus of Kantang Branch.
 Khao Chum Thong Junction - Junction for Nakhon Si Thammarat Branch.
 Nakhon Si Thammarat Station - Terminus of Nakhon Si Thammarat Branch. Nakhon Si Thammarat main station.
 Phatthalung Station - Phatthalung main station, crew changing station
 Hat Yai Junction - Main junction for Malaysia and Singapore and Main Line of Southern Line, Locomotive Depot and refueling facility. Main Songkhla Station.
 Padang Besar Station - International KTM station in Malaysia. Trains continue to Butterworth (Penang) and further.
 Pattani Station - formerly Khok Pho station, Pattani main station.
 Yala Station - Main Yala station, crew changing station
 Tanyong Mat Station - for Ra Ngae district and Narathiwat.
 Su-ngai Kolok Station - Terminus of Southern Line.  Used to be an international station until the termination of cross border services.

Namtok Branch

 Thon Buri Station - Terminus of Western Line
 Taling Chan Junction - Junction for Bangsue - Taling Chan link (also known as Rama 6 Line), the connection between south and north SRT systems opened with the building of the only rail bridge across the Chao Phraya River in 1925.
 Salaya Station - Bangkok suburban station close to Mahidol University (Salaya Campus)
 Nakhon Pathom Station - Nakhon Pathom main station.
 Nong Pladuk Junction - Junction for Suphan Buri and Kanchanaburi.
 Suphanburi Station - A 2-car DMU operates to Bangkok in the early morning and from Bangkok in the evening.
 Kanchanaburi Station - Main Kanchanaburi station
 Nam Tok Station - Terminus of Western Line.

Eastern Line

The Eastern Line begins at Bangkok before heading through Chachoengsao, Prachinburi to terminate at Aranyaprathet in Sa Kaew Province, 255 kilometers from Bangkok. There is a reopened rail link to Cambodia from Aranyaprathet. A branch line also connects Khlong Sip Kao Junction to the Northeastern Line at Kaeng Khoi Junction. At Chachoengsao Junction, there is another branch to Sattahip. Along the route to Sattahip, at Si Racha Junction, there is yet another branch towards Laem Chabang Deep Sea Port and further at Khao Chi Chan Junction for Map Ta Phut Port, in Rayong.

As of January 2023, all services terminate at Bangkok (Hua Lamphong) station. No services run to Krung Thep Aphiwat Central Terminal.

 Makkasan Station - the main depot of SRT (Makkasan Works)
 Hua Mak Station - Bangkok suburban station
 Hua Takhe Station - Junction for ICD.
 Chachoengsao Junction - Junction for Laem Chabang (double-track railway opened January 2012) and Aranyaprathet Line. Main Chachoengsao station.
 Khlong Sip Kao Junction- Junction for the Aranyaprathet Line and the Cargo Link to Kaeng Khoi Junction.
 Prachin Buri Station- Main Prachin Buri Province Rail Station.
 Kabin Buri Station- Half of long-distance Aranyaprathet Line services terminate here. In Prachin Buri Province.
 Sa Kaeo Station - Main Sa Kaeo station
Ban Klong Luk Border Station - Terminus of Aranyaprathet Main Line.
 Chonburi Station- Main Chonburi station
 Si Racha Junction - Junction for Laem Chabang Deep Sea Port.
 Pattaya Station - Railway station for Pattaya City.
 Khao Chi Chan Junction- Junction for Sattahip Commercial Port and Map Taphut Freight Line
 Ban Phlu Ta Luang Station -Terminus for current, operational, ordinary train from Bangkok.
 Map Ta Phut Station - Terminus of East Coast Line - freight trains only.

Maeklong Line

The Maeklong Railway, also operated by the SRT, is independent of the national rail network and is split into two sections. The line begins at Wongwian Yai in Bangkok before terminating at the Mahachai station in Samut Sakhon, where a ferry is used by passengers to cross the Tha Chin River. The line starts again across the river at Ban Laem and continues until the Mae Klong station of Samut Songkhram.

Services
SRT operates different types of rail services, each with different service patterns as outlined below:

 Special Express - fastest services, calling at the least number of intermediate stations between the origin and destination. Generally only call at main provincial stations.
 Express - slightly slower services, calling at a larger number of intermediate stations than Special Express. Generally call at all main provincial stations and at some major towns.
 Rapid - slower services calling at all main provincial stations and major towns and some smaller towns.
 Ordinary - services calling at all stations and some railway halts, originating or terminating in Bangkok.
 Commuter - services calling at all stations and all railway halts, originating or terminating in Bangkok.
 Local - services calling at all stations and all railway halts, originating or terminating outside Bangkok.
 Excursion - special services running on weekends such as the weekend Nam Tok Sai Yok Noi and Suan Son Pradiphat services, or services running on specific days or time periods such as the Pa Sak Jolasid Dam excursion train running only during the winter and the steam train services on designated days.

Long-distance services

SRT operates long distance passenger services on the following lines:

Northern Line
 Bangkok-Ayutthaya-Lopburi-Nakhon Sawan-Phitsanulok-Lampang-Chiang Mai

Northeastern Line
 Bangkok-Ayutthaya-Saraburi-Nakhon Ratchasima-Khon Kaen-Udon Thani-Nong Khai
 Bangkok-Ayutthaya-Saraburi-Nakhon Ratchasima-Buriram-Surin-Sisaket-Ubon Ratchathani

Eastern Line
 Bangkok-Chachoengsao-Prachinburi-Kabin Buri-Sa Kaeo-Aranyaprathet
 Bangkok-Chachoengsao-Chonburi-Pattaya-Ban Phlu Ta Luang

Southern Line
 Bangkok-Nakhon Pathom-Hua Hin-Surat Thani-Hat Yai-Butterworth (Malaysia)(International Express)
 Bangkok-Nakhon Pathom-Hua Hin-Surat Thani-Hat Yai-Su-ngai Kolok
 Bangkok-Nakhon Pathom-Hua Hin-Surat Thani-Thung Song-Nakhon Si Thammarat
 Bangkok-Nakhon Pathom-Hua Hin-Surat Thani-Thung Song-Kantang
 Bangkok-Nakhon Pathom-Kanchanaburi-Nam Tok

International services
Until 2016, SRT operated international services to Butterworth in Penang, Malaysia, in conjunction with Malaysian state operator KTM. Direct trains from Bangkok now only run as far as Padang Besar, due to the opening of KTM ETS. 

Since 2021, there 3 return trains operate from Hat Yai Junction and terminate at Padang Besar across the Malaysia–Thailand border. SRT also allows operation of the Eastern and Oriental Express on their tracks which runs from Singapore to Bangkok and vice versa, with a few trips to Laos and Chiang Mai Province.

A link across the First Thai–Lao Friendship Bridge to Thanaleng railway station, near Vientiane, opened in March 2009. In December 2010, following Chinese plans to extend their standard-gauge railway network to Xishuangbanna on the China–Laos border and further into Laos, the Thai government agreed to start negotiations on building a standard-gauge network. This would initially involve two lines: from Bangkok to the Lao border, and a longer line from Bangkok along the peninsula to the Malay border.

The rail link to Cambodia via Poipet from the railhead at Aranyaprathet was constructed in 1941, but was closed in 1961 due to strained Thai-Cambodian relations during the Cold War. The rail connection was repaired and reopened in April 2019. Cross-border services briefly ran until it was suspended by the outbreak of COVID-19. Currently, no cross-border services operate.

Railway connections to Myanmar (Burma), notably the infamous Death Railway, are defunct.

Rail links to adjacent countries
 Malaysia - same  gauge
 Padang Besar Checkpoint: open
 Su-ngai Kolok- Rantau Panjang Checkpoint: tracks connected but rail checkpoint closed, may reopen.
 Laos - same  gauge 
 Thai-Lao Friendship Bridge at Nong Khai Province, across the Mekong River: open
 Cambodia 
 Aranyaprathet-Poipet Checkpoint: tracks connected but rail checkpoint closed due to COVID-19.
 Myanmar
 Three Pagodas Pass Checkpoint: defunct, but projected extension will rebuild the route.
 see also Death Railway

Commuter trains

The SRT operates commuter rail services from Bangkok along the Northern and Northeastern Lines up to Ayutthaya, Ban Phachi Junction, Lopburi and Kaeng Khoi Junction. Ten trains run along the route on a daily basis. A new service serving between Thonburi and Salaya was launched on 22 October 2010.

The Red Line project is a new commuter rail system also owned by the SRT. and will replace portions of rail lines running through Bangkok, eliminating at-grade crossings.

Freight
Thai railways transported around 11 million tons of freight per year in 2007-2012, which was around 2% of the total amount of freight moved by all modes of transportation. While it is possible for freight trains to travel between Thailand and  the neighboring countries (Malaysia and Laos), the amount of international rail freight presently constitutes only a minuscule portion of Thailand's foreign trade. In 2012, merely 95 thousand tons of export cargo left Thailand by rail, as compared to 12 million tons of cargo exported by road, and 114 million tons of cargo exported by ship. For import, the rail transport's share was even smaller.

Thai railways  transport both bulk freight (primarily oil products and construction materials) and containerized freight. Most of the freight movement is between Bangkok and sea ports (in particular, between the deepwater port of Laem Chabang and the container terminal in Lad Krabang, in Bangkok's eastern suburbs).

In an attempt to increase the railway's share of the nation's freight transportation market, in 2016 the SRT, in a joint project with Japan, started experimenting with small, 12-foot containers. It is thought that, being smaller than the standard 20-foot containers, these containers can be more easily transported by truck between a rail station and the end customer. These containers are being tried on two routes from  Bangkok's Bang Sue station: a 722-km route to Lamphun Province in the north of the country,  and a 433-km route to Khon Kaen in the northeast.

Locomotives and multiple units

Active fleet

Diesel locomotives

Diesel multiple units

Steam locomotives 
Used for special services only.

Future railways

Track double tracking
In 2018, 91% of Thailand's 4,044 km rail network was single-track railway. A government initiative to move air and road transport to rail passed a major milestone on 28 December 2017 when the SRT signed nine contracts cost 69.5 billion baht with private contractors to complete track duplication on 702 km of the SRT network. The government's aim is to reduce the nation's logistical overhead, some 1.75 trillion baht, by moving air and road freight to rail because moving a tonne of freight by rail costs 0.93 baht per kilometre compared with 1.72 baht by road, but 86 percent of Thailand's freight moves by road and only two percent by rail. 

Completed double tracking project

 Kaeng Khoi - Chacheongsao
 Thanon Jira- Khon Kaen

Phase one of the project includes the following five sections of double-track railway:
 Map Kabao in Saraburi Province to Thanon Chira Junction in Nakhon Ratchasima Province, 134 km
 Lopburi to Pak Nam Pho in Nakhon Sawan, 145 km
 Nakhon Pathom to Hua Hin, 169 km
 Hua Hin to Prachuap Khiri Khan, 84 km
 Prachuap Khiri Khan to Chumphon, 168 km

Cabinet approval is expected to allow the signing of contracts for phase two of the track duplication project by March 2018. The second  phase will add a second track to 2,217 km of single track over nine rail links at a cost of 398 billion baht. Government plans call for an overall investment of 600 billion baht to create 2,588 km of double-track railway.

Phase 2

 285-kilometre Paknampo-Denchai route, estimated to cost Bt59.3 billion
 308km Jira-Ubon Ratchathani route costing Bt36 billion
 167km Khon Kaen-Nong Khai line costing Bt25.8 billion
 168km Chumphon-Surat Thani line costing Bt23 billion
 321km Surat Thani-Hat Yai-Songkhla line costing Bt56.1 billion
 189km Denchai-Chiang Mai line costing Bt57.9 billion
 45km Hat Yai-Padang Besar route costing Bt7.86 billion.

Feasibility studies on new lines
 Den chai- Chiang Rai
 Ban Phai - Nakhon Phanom
 Pak Nam Pho - Ban Phai

Station demolition
The SRT board approved a plan to demolish and rebuild 298 stations, two billion baht each, as part of the track duplication, also gone would be the unique vanilla and maroon paints scheme Southern Line stations to the south would be painted blue, symbolizing the sea, and Northern Line stations to the north would be painted green, symbolizing forests.

High Speed Railways

Northern HSR: Bangkok–Phitsanulok–Chiang Mai (Japanese-Thai project)
Japan would provide Shinkansen technology for a high-speed rail link between Bangkok and the northern city of Chiang Mai. Phase 1 would connect Bangkok to Phitsanulok. It is estimated to cost 280 billion baht. Seven stations are planned for this segment: Bang Sue, Don Mueang, Ayutthaya, Lopburi, Nakhon Sawan, Phichit, and Phitsanulok. To reduce costs, Thai authorities have proposed reducing the number of stations, but the Japan International Cooperation Agency (JICA) has rejected this suggestion on the grounds that it defeats the original purpose of the project. This portion of the route was scheduled to be submitted to the Thai cabinet for financial approval in August 2018.

After an initial cooperation agreement was signed in 2015, the Thai government formally requested the technical and financial assistance of the Japanese government in late-2016 for the building of the Northern HSR line to Chiang Mai. The Japanese completed a feasibility study which estimated that the project will cost 420 billion baht to build.

A feasibility study by JICA in mid-2018 reported that the train as planned would run at a loss. JICA's study projects only 10,000 passengers per day on the route, as opposed to the 30,000 per day forecasted in the original planning proposals. To be profitable from ticket sales would require 50,000 fares per day.

The Thai government announced in September 2019 that it may cancel Bangkok-Chiang Mai high-speed rail project after private investors declined to invest. The cost of the 670 kilometre line is estimated to be 400 billion baht. Japan has turned down the project as a bad investment due to low passenger projections.

Eastern HSR: Bangkok–U-Tapao Airport

A HSR line to the eastern seaboard was first proposed in 1996 but there was no progress for over a decade. In 2009, the government requested the Office of Transport and Traffic Policy and Planning (OTP) to create a plan for new HSR network in Thailand that included an eastern HSR line to Rayong. The route was finalised before the 2011 election with the promise to begin construction the next year if the government was re-elected, but they lost the election. After the 2011 election, the new government reviewed all HSR plans and the SRT stated that the line would be tendered in early-2014. After the May 2014 coup there were further delays while the military government reviewed all HSR lines, initially deferring all projects. In early-2016, the government agreed to proceed with the eastern HSR route and suggested that it could be extended to Don Mueang International Airport beyond the terminus at Bang Sue Intercity Terminal thus providing a link with three airports. Extending the line would provide a link between Don Mueang Airport, Suvarnabhumi Airport, and U-Tapao International Airport in Ban Chang District.

During 2017, OTP and the Ministry of Transport in consultation with the SRT agreed that by extending the line to terminate at Don Mueang it would effectively include the long delayed extension of the Airport Rail Link (Bangkok) from Makkasan Station to Don Mueang Airport as part of the project. The Eastern Economic Corridor Office (EEC Office) in October 2017 finalised previous OTP plans to build the 10 station Eastern HSR line linking Don Mueang airport, Bang Sue, Makkasan, Suvarnabhumi Airport, Chonburi, Si Racha, Pattaya, U-Tapao Airport, and Rayong. In early-2018, the section to Rayong was excluded due to environmental and safety concerns and it was decided that the line would terminate at U-Tapao Airport.

The SRT stated that the first tenders for the Eastern HSR line are expected to be tendered by May 2018 with a four month auction period before the contract is awarded. The cost of the project was estimated to be over 200 billion baht, of which the Thai Government would fund 123 billion baht and the private sector estimated to contribute 90 billion baht.

Two rival consortia vied for the airport link contract. The Charoen Pokphand (CP) Group-led consortium consisting of Italian-Thai Development, China Railway Construction Corporation Ltd, CH. Karnchang, and Bangkok Expressway and Metro, won the project with a 224 billion baht bid in December 2018. Their winning bid is valid until 8 November 2019. Until 16 October 2019, the consortium had refused to sign the contract, citing land expropriation and eviction problems and the consortium's request that the government share the risk in the project. Negotiations were further complicated by the resignation of the entire board of the State Railway. On 16 October 2019, news reports announced that the CP consortium intends to sign the rail deal on 25 October. Tanit Sorat, Vice-Chairman of the Employers' Confederation of Thai Trade and Industry, said that the contract signing delays are "...unlikely to affect the project because the government will carry out the project smoothly. The project was eventually approved in October 2019 as a public private partnership between the Thai government and Charoen Pokphand/China Railway Construction Corporation. The assets will revert to state ownership after 50 years.

Northeastern HSR: Bangkok–Nakhon Ratchasima–Nong Khai (Sino-Thai railway project)

In November 2014, Thailand and China signed a memorandum of understanding agreeing to construct the Thai portion of the transnational railway running from Kunming, China to the Gulf of Thailand. In November 2015, both parties agreed to a division of labour. Under the framework, a joint venture would be set up to run the project. China would conduct feasibility studies, design the system, construct tunnels and bridges, and lay track. Thailand would conduct social and environmental impact studies, expropriate land for construction, handle general civil engineering and power supply, and supply construction materials.

Once built, China would operate and maintain the system for the first three years of operation. Between the third and the seventh years, both countries would share responsibility. Later Thailand would take on responsibility with China as adviser. China would train Thai personnel to operate and maintain the system.

Dual standard-gauge tracks would be laid throughout the project. In Thailand, two routes would diverge at a junction in Kaeng Khoi District in Saraburi Province. One to connect Bangkok to Kaeng Khoi. The other route to connect Kaeng Khoi with Map Ta Phut of Rayong Province. From Kaeng Khoi tracks would lead north to Nakhon Ratchasima and on to Nong Khai Province. Construction would be divided into four sections: Bangkok-Kaeng Khoi, Map Ta Phut-Kaeng Khoi, Kaeng Khoi-Nakhon Ratchasima, Nakhon Ratchasima-Nong Khai.

Construction of Thailand's 873-kilometre-long portion of the railway system started in December 2017  and the Phase 1 line is due to open in 2023.  It will connect to a 417 km line from Vientiane to the northern Lao border and a 520 km line from the Lao border to Kunming.

Southern HSR: Bangkok–Hua Hin
This line would link Bangkok with Hua Hin. It would be 211 km long and estimated costs in 2016 were 152 billion baht.

See also
 Rail transport in Thailand

References

External links

  State Railway of Thailand 
  State Railway of Thailand on Facebook
  State Railway of Thailand on Twitter
  Thai Railway Stories
  illustrated description of the Siamese railways in the 1930s
 SE Asia passenger trains interactive map

 
1890 establishments in Siam
Companies based in Bangkok
Railway companies of Thailand
State enterprises of Thailand
Metre gauge railways in Thailand
Government-owned railway companies